Justin Wright Prentice (born March 25, 1994) is an American actor. He is best known for playing Bryce Walker, the main antagonist in the Netflix series 13 Reasons Why.

Prentice is also known for his role as Cash Gallagher in the ABC sitcom Malibu Country. In 2017, Prentice appeared in the AMC series Preacher.

Filmography

Film

Television

References

External links

1994 births
Living people
Male actors from Nashville, Tennessee
American male television actors
American male film actors